"I Hear Music" is a popular song composed by Burton Lane, with lyrics by Frank Loesser for the Paramount Pictures movie Dancing on a Dime (1940). In the film it was performed by Robert Paige, Peter Lind Hayes, Frank Jenks and Eddie Quillan.

Notable recordings
Nat King Cole - for the album The Piano Style of Nat King Cole (1956) (non vocal)
Bing Crosby - Bing Crosby's Treasury - The Songs I Love (1968 version)
Blossom Dearie - Blossom Dearie (1957)
Ella Fitzgerald - Ella Swings Brightly with Nelson (1962), Ella and Oscar (1975)
Billie Holiday - Lady Day: The Complete Billie Holiday on Columbia 1933–1944
Gene Krupa - recorded September 17, 1940 with vocalist Anita O'Day
Peggy Lee - for her album Jump for Joy (1959)
Bobby McFerrin - Spontaneous Inventions (1986)
Marian McPartland - At the Hickory House (2009)
Carmen McRae - The Carmen McRae-Betty Carter Duets (1987)
Anita O'Day - for her album Trav'lin Light (1961)
Oscar Peterson - Oscar Peterson Sings(1953)
Sue Raney - Sue Raney Volume II (2004)

References

Ella Fitzgerald songs
1940 songs
Songs with music by Burton Lane
Songs written by Frank Loesser
Songs written for films
Songs about music